Calli Cox (born February 26, 1977) is an American former pornographic actress.

Early life
In 1999, Cox graduated from Eastern Illinois University with a Bachelor of Science in education and started teaching that same year.  She was a teacher at Effingham Junior High and a substitute teacher at Urbana High School, having worked for a year at each school. She taught eighth grade English and Reading.

Career
Cox was working as a teacher during the day and as a stripper at night prior to becoming an adult film performer. She entered the adult film industry after moving to Los Angeles in February 2001. Her first scene was with Belladonna and Mr. Marcus in Oral Consumption 4 for Anabolic Video.

Cox became infamous after starring in the 2001–2002 Shane's World series of pornographic films with college students, including the executive vice president of the Arizona State University student body. On November 18, 2002, she appeared on The O'Reilly Factor to discuss the filming of Shane's World #32: Campus Invasion, which was shot on campus at Indiana University.

Cox began working as a publicist for Shane's World Studios in August 2002. She appeared in an episode of Inside Edition that aired on February 7, 2003, in which she defended the company's practice of filming sex scenes with students on college campuses. In 2003, she was appointed as director of marketing and publicity for the punk rock label Redwood Records. On July 9, 2003, she announced her retirement from performing in adult films. Her last scene was for the film College Invasion 2.

Awards and nominations

References

External links

 
 
 

1977 births
American female erotic dancers
American erotic dancers
American pornographic film actresses
American publicists
Schoolteachers from Illinois
American women educators
Eastern Illinois University alumni
Living people
People from Robinson, Illinois
Pornographic film actors from Illinois
21st-century American women